Weight cycling, also known as yo-yo dieting, is the repeated loss and gain of weight, resembling the up-down motion of a yo-yo. Many dieters are initially successful in the pursuit of weight loss but unsuccessful in maintaining the loss long-term and gain the weight back. The dieter then seeks to lose the regained weight, and the cycle begins again. Other individuals cycle weight deliberately in service of bodybuilding or athletic goals. It continues to be debated whether weight cycling causes increased risk of later obesity or cardiometabolic disease.

Causes

Dieting
The reasons for yo-yo dieting are varied but often include embarking upon a hypocaloric diet that was initially too extreme. At first the dieter may experience elation at the thought of weight loss and pride in their rejection of food. Over time, however, the limits imposed by such extreme diets cause effects such as depression or fatigue that make the diet impossible to sustain. Ultimately, the dieter reverts to their old eating habits, now with the added emotional effects of failing to lose weight by restrictive diet. Such an emotional state leads many people to eating more than they would have before dieting, causing them to rapidly regain weight.

Sports
In some sports where an athlete's weight is important, such as those that use weight classes or aesthetics, it is common for athletes to engage in weight cycling. Weight cycling is common among competitive combat sports athletes, including minors.

Mechanism
The process of regaining weight and especially body fat is further promoted by the high metabolic plasticity of skeletal muscle. The Summermatter cycle explains how skeletal muscle persistently reduces energy expenditure during dieting. In addition, food restriction increases physical activity which further supports body weight loss initially. Such weight regain in the form of preferential catch-up-fat is well documented after weight loss due to malnutrition, cancer, septic shock or AIDS and thus constitutes a general phenomenon related to weight loss.

Health effects
It continues to be debated whether weight cycling has negative health effects.

A 2019 systematic review and meta-analysis found that "Body-weight fluctuation was associated with higher mortality due to all causes and CVD and a higher morbidity of CVD and hypertension."

A 2019 review found that self-reported weight cycling was correlated with an increased risk of endometrial cancer. Weight cycling is also correlated with kidney cancer, independently of whether the person is overweight.

A 2021 systematic review and meta-analysis found that "weight cycling was a strong independent predictor of new-onset diabetes".

Weight cycling is also associated with poorer mental health.

See also
 Excess post-exercise oxygen consumption (EPOC)
 Food faddism
 Healthy diet
 Peltzman effect

References

Diets
Obesity